Inta Kļimoviča (born 14 December 1951) is a Soviet Latvian athlete who competed mainly in the 400 metres.

Born Inta Drēviņa, Kļimoviča trained at VSS Varpa in Riga. She competed for the USSR in the 1976 Summer Olympics held in Montreal, Quebec,  Canada in the 4 x 400 metres where she won the bronze medal with her teammates Lyudmila Aksyonova, Natalya Sokolova and Nadezhda Ilyina.

References

 

1951 births
Latvian female sprinters
Soviet female sprinters
Olympic bronze medalists for the Soviet Union
Athletes (track and field) at the 1976 Summer Olympics
Olympic athletes of the Soviet Union
Living people
European Athletics Championships medalists
Medalists at the 1976 Summer Olympics
Olympic bronze medalists in athletics (track and field)
Universiade medalists in athletics (track and field)
Latvian Academy of Sport Education alumni
Universiade silver medalists for the Soviet Union
Medalists at the 1975 Summer Universiade
Olympic female sprinters